Richmond National Cemetery is a United States National Cemetery  east of Richmond in Henrico County, Virginia. Administered by the United States Department of Veterans Affairs, it encompasses , and  had more than 11,000 interments. It is closed to new interments. Richmond National Cemetery was listed on the National Register of Historic Places in 1995.

History
The cemetery lies within what was once Richmond's wartime fortification lines built when the Confederate army defended Richmond during the American Civil War. The cemetery was established by the United States Congressional legislation in 1866 but the original plot of land was not formally purchased from local resident William Slater until 1867. Additional land purchases in 1868 and 1906 brought the cemetery to its current physical size.

The original burials in the cemetery were re-interments from Oakwood Cemetery and Hollywood Cemetery in Richmond. Those re-interments were primarily of Federal Union soldiers who perished from the effects of wounds while prisoners of war in the Richmond area military hospitals. Federal dead from the prisoner of war cemetery at Belle Island Prison Camp in the James River were also re-interred here. Some of the dead intended for the Seven Pines National Cemetery and Cold Harbor National Cemetery were transferred to Richmond when those smaller burial grounds quickly reached their initial capacities from post-war burials and reburials of the dead from the battle of Seven Pines (also known as Fair Oaks) and the battle of Cold Harbor.

Also re-interred in the Richmond National Cemetery were the remains of more than 500 Union prisoners of war, who had been originally interred in the "Shockoe Hill African Burying Ground", the city of Richmond's second African Burying Ground.  The "Shockoe Hill African Burying Ground" was Shockoe Hill Cemetery's segregated burying ground for free people of color, and the enslaved.

Military veterans from later eras are also buried here at Richmond National Cemetery.

Description

The main entrance is at the center of the north side and is protected by ornamental wrought iron gates supported by ornamental cast iron posts. Graves are marked with upright marble headstones.

The lodge was constructed in 1870 from a design by Quartermaster General Montgomery C. Meigs and is Second Empire in style. It is an L-shaped brick and stone structure with a slate mansard and tin roof. The main portion is one-and-one-half stories with dormer windows projecting from the mansard roof. The first floor contains an entry porch, living room, dining room, kitchen and office. The upper story contains two bed-rooms and a bath. The lodge also contains a basement, which is divided into two rooms by a masonry wall. A single-story rear addition was constructed c. 1900. The windows on the first story are one-over-one double-hung sash, while the upper-story windows are modern one-over-one sash replacements. The interior is finished with hardwood floors. The old porch was demolished in 1936 and a new larger porch constructed.

A  octagonal iron gazebo, Chinese Chippendale in style, was constructed c. 1890 in the north-east segment of the cemetery at the intersection of Sections 13-A, 14-A, 21-A, and 22-A. It was built to be used as a rostrum. The gazebo was removed in 1952, leaving only a concrete base and floor.

The roof is asphalt.

Capacity
Richmond National Cemetery is closed to new interments. The only interments that are being accepted are subsequent interments for veterans or eligible family members in an existing gravesite. Periodically however, burial space may become available due to a canceled reservation or when a disinterment has been completed. When either of these two scenarios occurs, the gravesite is made available to another eligible veteran on a first-come, first-served basis.

References

External links 
 National Cemetery Administration
 Richmond National Cemetery
 "The Soldiers of Shockoe Hill" – POW Burials
 
 
 
 

Cemeteries on the National Register of Historic Places in Virginia
Cemeteries in Richmond, Virginia
Tourist attractions in Henrico County, Virginia
United States national cemeteries
Virginia in the American Civil War
National Register of Historic Places in Henrico County, Virginia
Protected areas of Henrico County, Virginia
Historic American Landscapes Survey in Virginia
1886 establishments in Virginia